Leptepilepta is a genus of moths in the subfamily Lymantriinae. The genus was erected by Cyril Leslie Collenette in 1929.

Species
Leptepilepta betschi Griveaud, 1977
Leptepilepta diaphanella (Mabille, 1897)
Leptepilepta umbrata (Griveaud, 1973)

References

Lymantriinae